Athletics is one of the core sports on the programme for the Gymnasiade, an international multi-sport event organised by the International School Sport Federation (ISF). It has featured at all editions of the competition since 1976. An athletics competition was held the same year as the inaugural 1974 Gymnasiade, but was held separately at a different location. The event, contested by youth athletes under eighteen years old, was used as a reference point by the International Association of Athletics Federations (IAAF) when organising its first IAAF World Youth Championships in Athletics in 1999.

Editions

Champions

Boys track

Boys field

Girls track

Girls field

Medals
 Medals (1974-2013 / Only Gold)

See also
International athletics championships and games

References

 ISF World Gymnasiade. GBR Athletics. Retrieved on 2016-07-09.
 Doha Gymnasiade 2009 Athletics Results Book. ISF. Retrieved on 2016-07-09.
 Gymnasiade 2013 Athletics Results. CBat. Retrieved on 2016-07-09.
 https://web.archive.org/web/2016*/http://report.nat.gov.tw/ReportFront/report_download.jspx?sysId=C09000677&fileNo=001 - 2009
 https://web.archive.org/web/20180619113227/https://www.isfsports.org/file/6127/download?token=6An7FIKP - 2016
 http://www.gymnasiade2018.ma/gymnasiade2018-result/
 https://web.archive.org/web/20180713051229/http://www.gymnasiade2018.ma/wp-content/uploads/2018/05/ranking.pdf
 https://web.archive.org/web/20180713060634/http://www.gymnasiade2018.ma/wp-content/uploads/2018/05/Gym2018-lst-Medails.pdf
 http://www.worldtaekwondo.org/wp-content/uploads/2018/01/ISF-Gymnasiade-2018-bulletin-1-amended.pdf

External links
International School Sport Federation website

Gymnasiade
Gymnasiade
Athletics